Chhalaang is a 2020 Indian Hindi-language sports black comedy film directed by Hansal Mehta. It is produced by Ajay Devgan, Luv Ranjan, Ankur Garg and presented by Bhushan Kumar. Chhalaang stars Rajkummar Rao, Nushrat Bharucha and Mohammed Zeeshan Ayyub.

Principal photography commenced in last quarter of 2018. Initially named Turram Khan, Chhalaang was wrapped up in August 2019. Initially scheduled for a theatrical premiere, it was directly released online on Amazon Prime Video on 13 November 2020, coinciding with Diwali.

Plot 
Mahender Singh Hooda aka Montu is a lazy, uninspired, and unprofessional physical training instructor (PTI) at a school in Haryana, a job he got courtesy of his father Kamlesh Singh Hooda's influence as a lawyer. He lives with his parents and his brother and spends most of his time hanging out and messing around with his teacher-buddy, Mr. Shukla. When Neelima Mehra arrives in Montu's school as a new computer teacher, Montu finds himself falling in love with her, and the two start to grow very close when she tells her nickname Neelu.

To his surprise, Montu finds out that the school hired a new PTI, Inder Mohan Singh, as the government required PTIs to have a physical education degree, which Montu didn't have. Begrudgingly, Montu accepts a role as Inder Mohan's assistant. Montu quickly realizes that Inder Mohan is a much better PT teacher  than him, and gets even more irked when Neelu starts spending more time with Inder Mohan. One day, Inder Mohan keeps Montu's brother, Babloo, pinned to the ground as a punishment for not paying attention. This leads to a fight between Montu and Inder Mohan, after which Montu quits his job at the school.

Montu soon realizes that he cannot quit his job, and returns to the school to challenge Inder Mohan with a three sport competition: basketball, a 400m relay race, and kabaddi. Montu and Inder Mohan would coach the two separate groups of students participating. Whoever's team won the competition would stay as the PT teacher, while the other would have to leave, and Inder Mohan accepts the challenge. Montu foolishly lets Inder Mohan choose his team first in an attempt to impress Neelu by showing her his humility, and it backfires on him when he is left with a significantly weaker team.

As Montu starts to lose hope, Neelu comes to his side and helps him coach his team. She advises him to choose several girls for his team, which he does. Then, she helps him implement very unorthodox training regimes, such as running from guard dogs to increase speed, catching loose chickens to increase agility, and dribbling a basketball through a cow dung minefield to increase dribbling ability. Their efforts pay off, however, the children's parents start to revolt, saying that the competition is dragging their children's focus away from studies.  Montu's father with the help of Neelu  manage to get them back on board by using blackmail and threatening to re-open existing legal cases against them.

At the competition, Inder Mohan's team barely beat Montu's team in basketball, but Montu's team wins the competition with close victories in the 400m relay race and kabaddi. Inder Mohan accepts his defeat and congratulates Montu. Since, he realises that Inder is a much better coach than him, Montu proposes the idea of working together with Inder Mohan, as he has to learn a lot from him. Montu thanks the students and their parents for their trust and dedication. He then declares his love for Neelu, and she accepts his love proposal.

Cast

Main
 Rajkummar Rao as Mahender "Montu" Singh Hooda, a physical training instructor (PT teacher) (later becomes Neelu's husband)
 Nushrat Bharucha as Neelima "Neelu" Hooda(nee Mehra), a computer teacher in the same school (later becomes Montu's wife)
 Mohammed Zeeshan Ayyub as Inder Mohan Singh, senior PTI in Montu's school
 Saurabh Shukla as Mr. Shukla, a former Hindi teacher and former principal of Montu's school

Recurring
 Ila Arun as Usha Gehlot, the principal of Montu's school
 Satish Kaushik as Kamlesh Singh Hooda, a retired lawyer and Montu's father
 Jatin Sarna as Dimpy(chef in  a small snacks shop)
 Naman Jain as Babloo Singh Hooda, Montu's younger brother and student of Singh Sir
 Garima Kaur as Pinky Yadav
 Baljinder Kaur as Kamla Singh Hooda, Montu's mother
 Suparna Marwah as Sakshi S. Mehra, Neelu's mother
 Rajiv Gupta as Sanjay Mehra, Neelu's father

Production 

Hansal Mehta announced the film on 10 August 2018 with the title "Turram Khan" and Rajkummar Rao and Nushrat Bharucha in the lead roles. In 2019, Mohammed Zeeshan Ayyub joined the film to portray a supporting role.

Principal photography for the film began in late-2018. In June 2019, Rao and Mehta, along with Ayyub, were spotted filming a kabaddi scene in Mumbai's Film City.

In December 2019, the title of the film was changed to "Chhalaang", which means "Jump".

Release
Initially planned for release on 31 January 2020, it was announced on 26 December 2019 that the film has been postponed to 13 March 2020. It was further scheduled to 12 June 2020. Due to the COVID-19 pandemic, the film was again postponed. Finally it was released on 13 November 2020 on Amazon Prime Video coinciding with Diwali.

Soundtrack 

The film's music was composed by Hitesh Sonik, Guru Randhawa–Vee, Yo Yo Honey Singh and Vishal–Shekhar while lyrics written by Luv Ranjan, Guru Randhawa, Yo Yo Honey Singh, Alfaaz, Hommie Dilliwala and Panchhi Jalonvi.

The song "Deedar De" is a recreation of "Deedar De" from the film Dus by Vishal–Shekhar. People online criticized Vishal–Shekhar for recreating their song, but the duo clarified that they did not recreate the song,   they were credited because they composed the original.

Reception
The film currently holds a 70% on Rotten Tomatoes.

References

External links

Chhalaang on Bollywood Hungama

Indian black comedy films
Films postponed due to the COVID-19 pandemic
Indian sports comedy films
Films not released in theaters due to the COVID-19 pandemic
2020 black comedy films
Amazon Prime Video original films
Films set in Haryana
Films shot in Haryana
Films shot in Mumbai
Films scored by Guru Randhawa
Films scored by Hitesh Sonik
Films scored by Yo Yo Honey Singh
Films scored by Vishal–Shekhar